The Neptune Cable is a 500kV and 660 MW high-voltage direct current submarine power cable between Sayreville, New Jersey and Levittown, New York on Long Island.  It carries 22 percent of Long Island's electricity. It was developed by Anbaric Development Partners.

The cable is managed by Fairfield, Connecticut-based PowerBridge, LLC.

History 
The power plant was developed as part of a 2003 request for proposal from the Long Island Power Authority for new generating plants on Long Island that was a response to the Northeast blackout of 2003 and delays by Connecticut in activating the Cross Sound Cable, and due to continued high peak demand over multiple years.  This solicitation also resulted in construction of the Caithness Long Island Energy Center; Bethpage Energy Center; and Pinelawn Power Plant in West Babylon, New York.

The cable was constructed following the Long Island Power Authority's determination that importing electricity would make more sense economically than constructing new power generating stations on Long Island.

See also
Sayreville Energy Center
Red Oak Power
Bayonne Energy Center
Bergen Generating Station
Cross Sound Cable
Y-49 Cable
Y-50 Cable

References

External links
Official website
MasterElectricTransmissionPlanforNYC 2009

HVDC transmission lines
Submarine power cables
Sayreville, New Jersey
Port of New York and New Jersey
Electric power transmission systems in the United States
Electric power transmission systems in New Jersey
Energy infrastructure on Long Island, New York
New York (state) infrastructure